Sinthusa natsumiae is a butterfly of the family Lycaenidae first described by Hisakazu Hayashi in 1979. It is endemic to the Philippines and is found on many islands. It is very beautiful, especially on the forewing upperside of the male, where it has two brilliant blue colours. Its forewing length is about 12–15 mm.

References

Bibliography 
Hayashi, Hisakazu (1979). "New Lycaenid Butterflies from Mindanao, the Philippines". Tyô to Ga. 30 (1,2): 83–90.
Treadaway, C. G. (1995). "Checklist of the butterflies of the Philippine Islands (Lepidoptera: Rhopalocera)". Nachrichten des Entomologischen Vereins Apollo. Suppl. 14: 7–118.

Treadaway, Colin G. & Schröder, Heinz G. (2012). "Revised checklist of the butterflies of the Philippine Islands (Lepidoptera: Rhopalocera)". Nachrichten des Entomologischen Vereins Apollo. Suppl. 20: 1-64.

Butterflies described in 1979
Sinthusa